Semiopyla is a genus of jumping spiders that was first described by Eugène Louis Simon in 1901.  it contains only three species, found only in Paraguay, Argentina, and Mexico: S. cataphracta, S. triarmata, and S. viperina.

References

Sitticini
Salticidae genera